The Executive Agency Port Administration is a corporate body of the Bulgarian Ministry of Transport. It consolidates regional divisions in Varna, Bourgas, Rousse, and Lom. Its legal authority covers all ports, excluding the navy ones.

External links
 http://www.port.bg/ - Executive Agency "Port Administration", Изпълнителна агенция "Пристанищна администрация"

Transport in Bulgaria